Australian touch football may refer to:

 Rec footy, a non-contact version of Australian rules football
 Touch Aussie Rules, a non-contact version of Australian rules football played in the UK

See also
 Touch rugby, games derived from rugby football in which players touch, rather than tackle, their opponents
 Touch football (rugby league), the formal competitive version of touch rugby